BossAlien is a game developer based in Brighton, UK.
BossAlien was founded by ex-employees of Disney's Black Rock Studio in June, 2011. 
In July 2012 BossAlien Ltd was acquired by NaturalMotion Games Ltd.
In January 2014 Zynga acquired NaturalMotion.

The most notable release to date is the free-to-play drag-racing game CSR Racing, which was released in June 2012, on iOS and later on Android. CSR Racing, reached number one in Top Grossing and Top Free App Store charts across the world.
The follow-up title to CSR Racing was CSR Classics, released in October 2013 on iOS. CSR Classics features game mechanics similar to its sister title but features classic race cars from the 1960s to the 1980s.

Games developed

References

External links
 BossAlien website

Video game companies established in 2011
Video game companies of the United Kingdom